Madan-e Karak (also Romanized as Maʿdan-e Kerk) is a village in Qarah Kahriz Rural District, Qarah Kahriz District, Shazand County, Markazi Province, Iran. At the 2006 census, its population was 5, in 5 families.

References 

Populated places in Shazand County